Narenjbon-e Bala (also Romanized as Nārenjbon-e Bālā) is a village in Otaqvar Rural District, Otaqvar District, Langarud County, Gilan Province, Iran. At the 2006 census, its population was 56, in 17 families.

References 

Populated places in Langarud County